Albert George Gilbert (9 February 1892 – 18 January 1955) was an English professional footballer who played in the Football League for Brentford as a goalkeeper.

Career statistics

References

1892 births
English footballers
English Football League players
Brentford F.C. players
1955 deaths
Footballers from Harrow, London
Association football goalkeepers
Civil Service F.C. players
Isthmian League players